Molly (also spelled Molli or Mollie) is a diminutive of the feminine name Mary. It may less commonly be used as a diminutive for feminine names that begin with M, such as Margaret, Martha, Martina or Melinda, or Jewish Malka (also spelled Molka )

People

Women
 Mollie Arline Kirkland Bailey (c. 1844–1918), American circus musician, singer, wartime nurse and alleged Confederate spy
 Molly Bang (born 1943), American Illustrator
 Martina "Molly" Beck (born 1979), German retired biathlete
 Molly Bee (1939–2009), stage name of Mollie Gene Beachboard, American country music singer
 Molly Bish (1983–2000), American murder victim
 Molly Brant (c. 1736–1796), prominent Mohawk woman in the era of the American Revolution
 Margaret "The Unsinkable Molly" Brown (1867–1932), survivor of the sinking of the RMS Titanic, philanthropist and activist
 Molly Burch (born 1990), American musician 
 Molly Burnett (born 1988), American actress and singer
 Molly Carlson (born 1998), Canadian high diver
 Molly Crabapple (née Jennifer Caban; born 1983), American artist and writer
 Molly Dunsworth (born 1990), Canadian actress
 Molly Engstrom (born 1983), American ice hockey player
 Mary "Mollie" Evans (1922–2016), British antique dealer
 Mollie Hardwick (1916–2003), English author
 Molly Harrison (curator) (1909–2002), English museum curator and author
 Molly Hawkey (born 1978), American actress and photographer
 Molly Haskell (born 1939), American feminist film critic and author
 Mary Vivian "Molly" Hughes, British author
 Mollie Hunter (1922–2012), Scottish writer
 Mary "Molly" Ivins (1944–2007), American columnist, political commentator, humorist and author
 Mollie Johnson, 19th-century American Old West madam in South Dakota
 Margaret "Molly" Johnson (born 1959), Canadian singer and songwriter
 M. M. Kaye (1908–2004), British writer, author of The Far Pavilions
 Mollie Katzen (born 1950), American chef and cookbook writer
 Mary "Molly" Keane (née Mary Nesta Skrine; 1904–1996), Irish novelist and playwright
 Mollie King (born 1987), British singer with The Saturdays
 Molly Lamont (1910–2001), South African-born British film actress
 Mary MacCarthy (1882–1953), British writer associated with the "Bloomsbury Group"
 Mollie McConnell (1865–1920), American theater and silent film actress
 Molly McCook (born 1990), American actress
 Molly McGlynn, Canadian film and television director and screenwriter
 Molly Nyman, British composer
 Mollie Orshansky (1915–2006), American economist and statistician
 Molly Parker (born 1972), Canadian actress
 Molly Parkin (born 1932), Welsh painter, novelist and journalist
 Molly Peacock (born 1947), American-Canadian poet, essayist and creative non-fiction writer
 Molly Pearson (1875–1959), Scottish stage actress
 Mollie Phillips (1907–1994), British figure skater
 Molly Picon (née Małka Opiekun; 1898–1992), American actress in Yiddish theatre and film
 Molly Pitcher, nickname of a woman said to have fought in the American Revolutionary War Battle of Monmouth, generally believed to have been Mary Ludwig Hays McCauley
 Molly Quinn (born 1993), American actress
 Molly Ringwald (born 1968), American actress, singer, and dancer
 Molly Sandén (born 1992), Swedish singer
 Molly Shannon (born 1964), American comic actress
 Molly Shattuck (born c. 1967), American socialite and oldest NFL cheerleader
 Molly Sims (born 1973), American model and actress
 Mary Mollie Skinner (1876–1955), Australian Quaker, nurse and writer
 Molly Smitten-Downes (born 1987), British singer-songwriter
 Mary "Mollie" Sneden (1709–1810), ferry operator before and after the American Revolution
 Marthe "Mollie" Steimer (1897–1980), Russian-American anarchist, trade unionist, anti-war activist and free-speech campaigner
 Mollie Sugden (1922–2009), British actress
 Mememolly (born Molly Templeton in 1989), British-Canadian Internet personality
 Mollie Tibbetts (1998–2018), American murder victim
 Molly Tuttle (born 1993), American singer and musician
 Molly White (writer) (born 1993/1994), American software engineer, Wikipedia editor, and cryptocurrency critic
 Molly White (politician) (born 1958), American politician
 Molly Wood (born 1975), American executive editor and writer

Fictional characters

In television and film
 Molly Goldberg, from The Goldbergs (broadcast series)
 Molly Jones, from A Country Practice
 Molly Baker, English name of Naru Osaka from Sailor Moon
 Molly Carter, from The Young and the Restless 
 Molly Coddle, from Bump in the Night (TV series)
 Molly Dobbs, from Coronation Street
 Molly Flynn-Biggs, from Mike & Molly
 Molly Hooper, from Sherlock
 Molly Lasch, from We'll Meet Again (2002 film)
 Molly Lansing-Davis, from General Hospital
 Molly MacDonald, from Arthur (TV series)
 Molly Monster, from Little Muppet Monsters
 Molly the Mermaid, from Barney and the Backyard Gang: A Day at the Beach
 Molly O'Brien, from Star Trek: The Next Generation and Star Trek: Deep Space Nine
 Molly Walker, from Heroes (American TV series)
 Molly, from Buffy the Vampire Slayer
 Molly, from Friends and Joey
 Eva "Molly" Wei, from   Ōban Star-Racers
 Molly, from The Big Comfy Couch
 Molly Davis, from Toy Story
 Molly Williams, from My Little Pony (TV series)
 Molly, from Annie (1982 film)
 Molly, from Bubble Guppies
 Molly, from Homeward Bound: The Incredible Journey
 Molly, from The Basil Brush Show
 Molly McGee, from The Ghost and Molly McGee
 Molly McGee, from Fibber McGee and Molly
 Molly Harper, from Final Destination 5
 Molly Collins, from The Amazing World of Gumball
 Molly Weasley, from the Harry Potter franchise
 Molly Solverson, from Fargo (TV series)
 Molly Gunn, from Uptown Girls

In books and comics
 Milly-Molly-Mandy from the books by Joyce Lankester Brisley
 Molly Millions (also known as Sally Shears), from the stories and novels by William Gibson
 Molly McIntire, protagonist from the American Girl series
 Molly Moon, from the Molly Moon series
 Molly Weasley, from the Harry Potter series
 Molly Bloom, wife of Leopold Bloom in James Joyce's Ulysses
 Molly Fitzgerald, alter ego of the Marvel Comics superhero Shamrock
 Mollie, from the novel Animal Farm
 Molly Mallard, a Disney character who is Scrooge McDuck's paternal grandmother
 Molly Carpenter, whose full name is Margaret Katherine Amanda Carpenter, is initially featured in The Dresden Files as a recurring character, but grows into a main role in the novels following "Proven Guilty"
 Molly the Goldfish Fairy, from the Rainbow Magic franchise
 Molly, shortened name of Lady Emily Lenox, the sister-in-law of Charles Lenox in Charles Finch's mysteries
 Molly Gibson, main character in Elizabeth Gaskell's Wives and Daughters

Animals
Polly and Molly, cloned sheep

See also 
 Moll (disambiguation)

English given names
English feminine given names
Feminine given names
Hypocorisms